Klára Marik (18 March 1903 – 25 January 2005) was a Hungarian writer. She submitted some of her work into the "Epic works" category of the art competitions at the 1936 Summer Olympics, but did not win a medal. At the time of her death, she was the oldest living Hungarian Olympian. She graduated from the Hungarian University of Fine Arts as one of the first physical education teachers before studying in England and becoming an art historian.

Bibliography
 Viennese porcelain, 1970
 Az üveg müvészete kiállítás : az Iparmüvészeti Múzeumban, 1961, vezető, 1961
 La faience de la Renaissance en Hongrie, 1961
 A XIX. századi magyar kerámika néhány problémája, 1960
 Porzellan aus Herend, 1966
 A nagyrévi Kontsek gyüjtemény, 1966
 L' exposition intitulée "L'art du verre", 1963
 Le Musée international de céramique de Faenza et ses céramiques hongroises, 1962
 A faenzai Ferniani mühely fajánszai gyüjteményünkben = Faïence de la manufacture Ferniani de Faenza dans la collection du Musée, 1964

References

External links

1903 births
2005 deaths
Hungarian centenarians
Hungarian women writers
Olympic competitors in art competitions
Hungarian art historians
Hungarian University of Fine Arts alumni
Women centenarians
Women art historians